Ring I (pronounced "ring one") is the busiest road in Finland, carrying up to 113,000 vehicles per day. It is the innermost of the three beltways in the Greater Helsinki region, numbered as regional route 101 and  runs from the easternmost part of Espoo to Itäkeskus in eastern Helsinki. It is primarily intended for local traffic—before the large road numbering change in the 1990s and the reconstruction of Ring III, Ring I was also designated as a bypass for avoiding Helsinki centre.

Overview
Ring I has at least two lanes per direction for its entire length but a speed limit that never exceeds  owing to heavy traffic. With the introduction of new grade-separated interchanges, provisions have been made to increase the speed limits to 70–80 km/h. Eventually, all of the junctions on Ring I will be upgraded to grade-separated interchanges. However, the road was not originally constructed as a motorway, which limits its capacity..

See also
Ring II
Ring III
Itäväylä
Länsiväylä
Tuusulanväylä
Vihdintie

External links

Ring roads in Finland
Roads in Finland
Streets in Helsinki
Transport in Helsinki
Transport in Espoo